Looney Tunes Collector: Martian Alert! (Known as simply Looney Tunes Collector: Alert! in North America), is a Looney Tunes game developed and published by Infogrames for the Game Boy Color in 2000.

A sequel: Looney Tunes Collector: Martian Revenge!, was released a few months later, and shares near-identical gameplay, except it is played from Marvin the Martian's perspective.

Story 
 
Marvin the Martian is at it again, desperately trying to destroy Earth. His faithful companion, K-9, is in deep trouble though. He cleaned the flying saucer to help his master and in doing so, accidentally threw out all of the instant Martians.

Bugs Bunny, while on his way to a vacation spot in Pismo Beach, overhears Marvin yelling at K-9 about the plot. Bugs' vacation plans will have to be put on hold, as he must first save the world.

Gameplay 
Players control Bugs (as well as other characters) in an attempt to prevent Marvin from destroying the Earth. This game, like many created during the Pokémon craze, attempts to recreate the "capture and collect" aspect of the Pokémon games; thus, Bugs can at any time call any Looney Tunes character that he has obtained into battle, or put them to a separate use, such as Daffy Duck's swimming or Witch Hazel's broomstick flying.

Reception 

The game was met with average reception upon release, as GameRankings gave it a score of 73.71%.

References

External links 
 

2000 video games
Game Boy Color games
Video games based on Looney Tunes
Game Boy Color-only games
Video games scored by Alberto Jose González
Video games developed in France
Infogrames games
Cartoon Network video games
Multiplayer and single-player video games